A tumbleweed is a kind of plant habit or structure.

Tumbleweed, tumble-weed or tumble weed may also refer to:

Films
 Tumbleweeds (1925 film), William S. Hart film
 Tumbling Tumbleweeds (1935 film), Gene Autry film
 Tumbleweed (1953 film), Nathan Juran film
 Tumbleweeds (1999 film), Gavin O'Connor film

Music
 Tumbleweed (band), an Australian band
 The Tumbleweeds, also known as "Cole Wilson and His Tumbleweeds", a New Zealand band
 Tumbleweeeds, a Dutch band featuring Ton Masseurs
 "Tumbleweed" (song), by Sylvia, 1980
 "Tumbleweed", a song by Keith Urban from The Speed of Now Part 1 (2020)

Organizations
 Tumbleweed Tex Mex Grill & Margarita Bar, a restaurant chain
 Tumbleweed Communications, a former Internet security corporation, acquired by Axway in 2008
 Tumbleweed Tiny House Company

Plants

 Amaranthus albus
 Amaranthus graecizans
 Anemone virginiana, tumble-weed
 Anastatica, rose of Jericho, also known as Palestinian tumbleweed
 Centaurea diffusa, diffuse knapweed
 Centaurea stoebe, spotted knapweed
 Cycloloma, tumble-weed
 Corispermum hyssopifolium
 Ficinia spiralis, a New Zealand sedge
 Kali (plant), (Synonym Salsola) tumbleweed (some species)
 Kali tragus, the usual tumbleweed appearing in Western movies
 Panicum capillare
 Psoralea, white tumbleweeds
 Selaginella lepidophylla, a tumbleweed spikemoss, also known as rose of Jericho
 Sisymbrium altissimum, tumbleweed mustard

Other uses
 Tumbleweeds (comic strip), by Tom K. Ryan
 Tumbleweed (operating system), a rolling release version of openSUSE Linux
 The tumbleweed gambit, a variation in the King's Gambit chess opening

See also
 
 
 Tumble (disambiguation)
 Weed (disambiguation)